Barnstable County Hospital was a hospital operated by Barnstable County, Massachusetts which was operational from the late 1800s to 1995.  It was located in Pocasset, a village in Bourne. It was used after its closing as a medical examiner's office until 1999, when it was finally closed for good. The hospital was the location of the autopsy of John F. Kennedy Jr., his wife, and her sister after their deaths. Within the county, it was officially run by the Barnstable County Hospital Department, until the hospital was closed on May 1, 1995. In 2003, an agreement was entered which would allow for the creation of affordable housing on the site of the hospital. The site was completely leveled, with the exception of two buildings.

References

Bourne, Massachusetts
Hospital
Hospitals in Barnstable County, Massachusetts
Defunct hospitals in Massachusetts
Hospitals disestablished in 1995